Karl Rabe (29 October 1895, Pottendorf, Austria - 28 October 1968) was an automobile designer and was the Chief Designer at Porsche.  He helped Ferdinand Porsche to develop the Porsche's transmissions.

References

1895 births
1968 deaths
Austrian automobile designers
Austrian automotive engineers
Porsche people
People from Baden District, Austria